Pseudacanthicus is a genus of medium to large-sized suckermouth armored catfishes native to South America, where found in the Amazon and Orinoco basins, as well as rivers of the Guianas. They are primarily found in fast-flowing waters, sometimes relatively deep. They are sometimes kept in aquariums.

Species
There are currently 8 recognized species in this genus:

 Pseudacanthicus fordii (Günther, 1868)
 Pseudacanthicus histrix (Valenciennes, 1840)
 Pseudacanthicus leopardus (Fowler, 1914)
 Pseudacanthicus major Chamon & Costa e Silva, 2018
 Pseudacanthicus pirarara Chamon & L. M. de Sousa, 2016
 Pseudacanthicus pitanga Chamon, 2015
 Pseudacanthicus serratus (Valenciennes, 1840)
 Pseudacanthicus spinosus (Castelnau, 1855)

Some of these were only recently described and undescribed species probably remain. In contrast, P. fordii is likely a synonym of P. serratus, and P. histrix likely a synonym of P. spinosus.

Description
They have a diverse range of colour patterns, typically light to dark grey or brown, often with black spots, which may result in a netted appearance. The fins and body may have orange-red sections or a red wash. Colouration varies between rivers and can also change throughout the lifetime of a single individual. The abdomen is covered in small plates in adults. The caudal fin is forked and may have filaments. The jaws are short, forming an acute angle at their union; the teeth are few and stout. The adipose fin is present.

Conservation
Some of the species in the genus are threatened by mining, deforestation and especially the building of dams. Like many other loricariids, Pseudacanthicus are found in flowing waters with high levels of oxygen and dams typically flood these, transforming them to reservoirs. In some regions where dams have been built, the local populations of Pseudacanthicus have seriously decreased or even disappeared. In contrast, although some species often are caught for the aquarium trade, this does not appear to represent a serious threat to them.

References

Ancistrini
Fish of South America
Fish of Brazil
Fish of Guyana
Fish of Suriname
Catfish genera
Taxa named by Pieter Bleeker
Freshwater fish genera